In analytic number theory the Friedlander–Iwaniec theorem states that there are infinitely many prime numbers of the form . The first few such primes are

2, 5, 17, 37, 41, 97, 101, 137, 181, 197, 241, 257, 277, 281, 337, 401, 457, 577, 617, 641, 661, 677, 757, 769, 821, 857, 881, 977, … .

History
The theorem was proved in 1997 by John Friedlander and Henryk Iwaniec. Iwaniec was awarded the 2001 Ostrowski Prize in part for his contributions to this work.

Refinements

The theorem was refined by D.R. Heath-Brown and Xiannan Li in 2017. In particular, they proved that the polynomial  represents infinitely many primes when the variable  is also required to be prime.

where

Special case
When , the Friedlander–Iwaniec primes have the form , forming the set
2, 5, 17, 37, 101, 197, 257, 401, 577, 677, 1297, 1601, 2917, 3137, 4357, 5477, 7057, 8101, 8837, 12101, 13457, 14401, 15377, … .

It is conjectured  (one of Landau's problems) that this set is infinite. However, this is not implied by the Friedlander–Iwaniec theorem.

References

Further reading 
.

Additive number theory
Theorems in analytic number theory
Theorems about prime numbers